Michel Joubert (born 3 September 1986) is a retired Seychellois football striker.

References 

1986 births
Living people
Seychellois footballers
The Lions FC players
Seychelles international footballers
Association football forwards